CSS Admiral has been the name of two Confederate States Navy ships of the American Civil War:

 CSS Admiral, side-wheel steamer renamed , surrendered to the United States at the end of the war.

See also 
 

Ship names